Dudkino is a rural locality (a village) in Chyobsarskoye Urban Settlement, Sheksninsky District, Vologda Oblast, Russia. The population was 3 as of 2002.

Geography 
Dudkino is located 35 km east of Sheksna (the district's administrative centre) by road. Gorka is the nearest rural locality.

References 

Rural localities in Sheksninsky District